William Reed (born April 1, 1970) is a former American sprinter. After a heralded prep career at Central High School in Philadelphia, Reed endeavored upon a prosperous career in hospitality. He holds world best for his age group in the 300m at U15 and U16 levels with 34.58 and 33.19 seconds indoor respectively.

In 1987, Reed set a World Best in the Youth ranks in the 400 metres.

References

External links

1970 births
Living people
Track and field athletes from Philadelphia
American male sprinters
Central High School (Philadelphia) alumni